Alexandru Flenchea (born 25 November 1979) is a Moldovan conflict resolution expert and former politician. He has served as Deputy Prime Minister for Reintegration in the Chicu Cabinet.

References 

1979 births
Living people